The chapters of Togari are written and illustrated by Yoshinori Natsume. The manga was serialised in Shogakukan's Weekly Shōnen Sunday from 2000 to 2002, ending the series prematurely at 68 chapters. The individual chapters were published into 8 bound volumes with no solid ending. The abrupt ending is intentional by the publishers as the last four pages of volume 8 has a spoof advertisement for "Togari: The Perfect Edition". Then the publishers apologises for the spoof the last page of the volume. Shogakukan released the manga's 8 tankōbon volumes between January 2001 and March 18, 2008. Viz Media released the manga in North America in 8 tankōbon volumes between July 10, 2007 and September 9, 2008. Delcourt released the manga in France in 8 tankōbon volumes between August 1, 2002 and December 5, 2003.

The story follows orphan Tobei, who was beheaded  for committing countless crimes in the Edo period and sent to Hell where he suffered for 300 years. The regent of Hell makes Tobei an offer to slay 108 "Togas" (spiritual manifestations of sin) in 108 days in 21st-century Japan  with Togari, a magical sword. Tobei readily agrees for the chance to be free from Hell.



Volume list

References

Togari